Phryganidia californica, the California oakworm or California oak moth, is a moth of the  family Notodontidae. The species was first described by Alpheus Spring Packard in 1864. It is found along the coasts of the US states of California and Oregon.

They are tan to gray moths with prominent wing veins. Adults are on wing from March to November. There are two generations per year in northern California. Sometimes there is a third generation in southern California.

The larvae feed on the leaves of oak, especially Quercus agrifolia (coast live oak). Young larvae feed between veins on the lower leaf surface. Although the upper leaf surface is left intact, it dries out and turns brown. Larvae in later instars chew completely through the leaf blade, often leaving only major leaf veins. Small frass pellets drop from the canopy as larvae feed. In outbreak years, individual trees or groups of trees may be almost entirely defoliated, typically by late summer or early fall. The larvae are black with lengthwise yellow stripes. Pupation takes place in a white or yellow pupa with black markings.

Life stages

External links
 

Notodontidae
Moths of North America
Fauna of the California chaparral and woodlands
Moths described in 1864